The Men's 82.5 kg powerlifting event at the 2004 Summer Paralympics was competed  on 26 September. It was won by Mohammed Khamis Khalaf, representing .

Final round

26 Sept. 2004, 13:45

References

M